Doko is a Bantu language of the Democratic Republic of Congo. Ethnologue 16 classifies it as a dialect of Ngombe language, while Maho (2009) lists it as a separate, though perhaps unclassified, language.

References

Buja-Ngombe languages